Željko Jovanović may refer to:

 Željko Jovanović (politician) (born 1965), Croatian politician and physician
 Željko Jovanović (photographer) (born 1961), Serbian newspaper and art photographer